Castiglione in Teverina is a comune (municipality) in the Province of Viterbo in the Italian region Lazio, located about  northwest of Rome and about  northeast of Viterbo.

History
Castiglione is located in an area once settled by the Etruscans. The current town developed from around the year 1000 from a castle and, in 1351, it housed the inhabitants of the destroyed Paterno. It was a fief of the Monaldeschi della Cervara and of the Savelli families. Sold to the House of Farnese in 1539, it was part of the Duchy of Castro until 1637, when the citizens bought back their freedom for 20,000 ducats.

It remained part of the Papal States until 1870, when it was annexed to the newly unified Kingdom of Italy.

Main sights
Collegiata of Sts. Philip and James. It includes a late 15th-century baptistery
Church of Madonna della Neve
Museum of Wine

References

External links
 Official website

Cities and towns in Lazio